The Cristur (also: Valea Cristurului or Cârjiți) is a left tributary of the river Cerna in Romania. It flows into the Cerna in the village Cristur.

References

Rivers of Romania
Rivers of Hunedoara County